Edifi, a name constructed from "education" and "finance", was a college financial aid services company located in Albany, New York, which operated nationally. Its legal name was CFAS (College Financial Aid Systems), LLC. Its central activity was filling out the Free Application for Federal Student Aid, best known as FAFSA, for parents of college applicants. At the time this was a paper form.

Origins
Edifi was founded by Larry Schechter in 1991; he remained its sole owner throughout (with a hiatus in 2002-2004). It started in Wellesley, Massachusetts, but with Schechter's relocation to the Albany, New York area, it moved along with him, and operated first from a bare one-room office on Union Street in Schenectady. Growth led it to move in 2001 to an office suite located at 409 New Karner Road in an unincorporated area of Albany county (mailing address Albany); further growth led it to move in 2003 to a larger office suite at 450 New Karner Road, where it ran a call center, with five clocks - Eastern, Central, Mountain, Pacific, and Hawaii times - on the wall. When winding down operations it moved back to Union Street.

The company started when friends and neighbors of Schechter asked him for help in completing FAFSA forms. Sensing that money could be made, Schechter formed a company, which initially sold its services door-to-door. His primary collaborator and second-in-command, once the company had moved to Schenectady, was Maura Kastberg, who had a B.S. in mathematics. In order to grow the company, they decided to use a seminar method to make presentations to larger groups of people. This was very successful and the company had explosive growth; in the early 2000s it made the magazine Inc.'s list of the fastest-growing companies in the United States.

Edifi originally priced its services at about $495, and offered a money-back guarantee, if it could not get the family enough additional financial aid to cover its fee. It abandoned the guarantee after having to pay out on some cases.

Organization
Edifi was divided into five departments: Sales, Accounting, Reservations, which set up appointments for the seminars, Customer Service, which dealt with the clients and input data from client phone interviews and tax documents to the company's proprietary software (a customized "front end" for Microsoft Access), and Forms, which was in charge of completing financial aid forms, and whose new hires were tested for their printing (handwriting) ability.

Marketing
The company's services were hard to understand and marketing was expensive. In fact, its greatest single expense was postage for marketing materials. John Braat, whose background was in sales, was Chief Operating Officer and head of the Sales Department. The company had three teams of commissioned salespeople, many of whom made more than the employees who actually did the work. Braat spent a lot of effort analyzing where seminars (sales meetings) would best be held. It did not market in states with no clear centers of population, such as Montana. For large cities like New York, all three sales teams would work together. The seminars were scheduled so as to avoid hurricane season in the South, and winter storms in the North. Flying the salespeople all around the country was another large expense.

Names of prospects were purchased, from brokers who sold information on college prospects; most were students who had taken the College Board examinations. Edifi came up with the technique of sending invitations to students - rather than their probably more skeptical parents - to attend a free seminar where they could learn about opportunities for college grants and scholarships. The salespersons were not to lie to the families about what Edifi could do (although sometimes they apparently did). The original contracts were rewritten to say that Edifi had no special "connections" with college financial aid offices and did nothing that parents could not do for themselves, if they put in the time and effort.

There was somewhat of a disconnect, though, between what was presented to the families in the seminars and what Edifi actually did. One Edifi employee who knew the company's operations asked to join the sales team, and was a failure. It worked better if the salespeople did not know anything more than what their training classes taught them.

Services

The first service Edifi offered families was to give estimates of the financial aid a family could expect to receive from whatever colleges it chose, and what the "bottom line" for each of those colleges would be. Behind this was Edifi's ability to find or calculate the true cost of attendance for each college — since 2011 posted on each college's Web site, by Federal law, but before that often hard to locate, if the figure was public at all. (In those cases Edifi calculated an estimate.) This was intended to help families make good decisions, at least from a financial point of view, of where the child should go to college.

When the student was a senior, Edifi completed the FAFSA, the College Board Profile, state, and college need-based forms and made sure things were submitted at the best times. For example, under regulations of the time, the FAFSA should have been submitted immediately after the applications opened in January, estimating income rather than waiting months until taxes were done before applying. Edifi would submit a second, updated FAFSA once a family's taxes were completed.

When financial aid offers were received, if copies of those were sent to Edifi, it would prepare a written analysis of the offer to make it understandable. (A minority of financial aid award letters were easy to understand, but many were cryptic or outright deceptive, presenting unsubsidized loans as if they were really financial aid.) It would also indicate, based on published information and its own previous experience with the colleges, whether the offer was or was not "reasonable". Many families did not know, and still do not know, that financial aid offers can be appealed. Edifi looked for reasons that an appeal could be filed: because the offer was not in line with the college's offer history (it was not "reasonable"), the family had high medical expenses, loss of income, high debt, and so on. Edifi would write appeal letters which the parents would sign and send to the college. Edifi would analyze the revised offer, if any, and sometimes filed a second appeal if the results of the first were unsatisfactory.

Some clients clearly benefited from Edifi's services and expert advice, and there were a few spectacular successes. For example, a little-known fact that Edifi informed its clients about was that more expensive colleges could actually cost less, because these colleges often had so much financial aid to give out that it more than made up for the higher price. Some families, especially non-English-speaking ones, needed help with the financial aid process and forms. Edifi told the parents what they needed to do and when they needed to do it, and made sure, at least in theory, that things were done on time. However, a student who was going to a local community college, and whose high school would help with the paperwork, got little return on the parents' investment.

Because of the high cost of marketing in a seminar format, to ensure a reasonable return on investment, Edifi marketed its services on a "package" rather than a "menu" basis. One fixed price covered all the services and how many of them the family chose to use depended on which colleges the student applied to and the degree to which the family cooperated with Edifi, sending in needed documents like tax returns and financial aid offers. Not all did.

Client dissatisfaction

About one-third of the clients thought that they had made a great decision contracting with Edifi, enrolled their younger children, and got their friends to sign up, thereby receiving a discount on renewals of their service for the students' sophomore and later years. Another third was not as enthusiastic, but felt that they had at least gotten what they paid for. The last third felt they had been ripped off.

Edifi had to deal with a constant stream of charge-backs from credit card companies, complaints filed with Better Business Bureaus (which gave Edifi an "F" rating, because of its marketing), and whose investigations Edifi took seriously,  investigations by attorneys general, angry high school guidance counselors who said they did everything Edifi did, but for free (which most do not), and the like. There was also many "exposés" in newspapers and on television, most of which mistakenly believed Edifi was a "scholarship search" service, which it was not. Under New York State law, a three-day (later, five-day) "cooling-off period" was required when a contract was made, during which time the contract could be canceled without penalty. After this period, Edifi rarely made refunds. Compounding the problem was when Edifi sold its services to undocumented immigrants who were ineligible for federal student aid and in most states, state student aid. Some parents did not know English and did not understand the contract they signed; however, under New York law the contract was still valid.

Maura Kastberg spent a lot of her time dealing with this constant stream of unhappy customers and those acting on their behalf. As part of a legal settlement, the company agreed to stop marketing in the state of Minnesota.

Employee lawsuits
There was also a lawsuit by an employee, Huda Saaidi, who alleged discrimination and a hostile work environment. Another employee, Steve d'Emilia, successfully appealed a discharge for cause with the New York State Bureau of Unemployment Compensation (meaning that he was entitled to unemployment compensation).

The Client Services Department
The department which interacted with the clients - interviewing them, gathering and processing their documents - was the Client Services Department. It was also this department that analyzed financial aid offers (arguably Edifi's most important service) and wrote appeals when appropriate. Translating the information gathered and input by Client Services into filled-out FAFSAs, CSS Profiles, and college financial aid forms was done by a different and much quieter department, Forms. As a quality control and check against errors, all completed work had to be proofed by a different employee.

The workers who actually did the work were primarily college students paid an hourly wage ($9.00 to $10.00 an hour in 2003). Turnover was high and morale was low. Many quit when they learned what Edifi did and what its reputation was. Katzberg was universally perceived as an abrasive, unsupportive manager; a former, angry employee described her online as "Hitler in a ball gown", and her and Braat as "borderline con artists". The company was uninterested in retaining experienced workers, who would have improved service but would have had to have been given raises.
 	
While it was not a deliberate policy (though it had the side effect of increasing the owner's profit), the company had difficulty retaining enough workers to service all its clients, and some clients did not receive the services they paid for. Other families did not use all, or any, of the services, ignoring or not noticing the notices (sometimes in the form of newsletters) Edifi sent through the mail. If the parents sent in documents as requested and called the company regularly to be sure their file was being processed, the company did as good a job as it could. Unfortunately, while documents should have been processed rapidly and without parent phone calls, this was not always the case, and cases in which nothing was done were not rare. One year hundreds of financial aid offers never got analyzed nor appeal letters written (unless parents called to inquire) because Client Services did not have the staff needed. The company did make a full refund to one pair of parents who pursued the matter, for whom nothing had been done as late as April of the student's senior year, although all necessary documents were in the student's file. Many families simply forgot about Edifi, amid everything going on in the senior year.

Edifi did not have a philosophy of ripping people off, and complained bitterly and publicly that it was being unfairly lumped in with out-and-out scams, such as scholarship search services; it pointed out repeatedly that a sign of its good faith was that it did not guarantee any particular result. To the contrary, there was some pride in what was done (much or most of the time), in the many cases in which students were really helped.

Extra-FAFSA services
Edifi (Maura Kastberg and Larry Schechter) were constantly looking for additional services they could provide other than filling out the FAFSA and other financial aid forms. These included:

 Newsletters, whenever Kastberg found time to write one. These gave financial aid reminders and tips.
 Handbooks for each year in high school, with things to be thought of or worked on for each year.
 An on-line guidance counselor, who would respond to questions posted. Guidance counselor questions were answered by staff, there was no one guidance counselor.
 A college search engine (a leased service).
 Online SAT preparation and sample tests (also not an in-house product, acquired through a cooperative relationship with a major college prep company).

The reason behind the push for non-FAFSA services was in part for marketing purposes but also because so many students did not take the proper high school classes that would best prepare them, or were required, for college and result, in some cases, in greater financial aid eligibility.

The end of Edifi

Larry Schechter had dreams of enlarging the company: by partnering with financial planners, for example. In 2002 Schechter sold the company to two investors who hoped to make money by reselling it to the Princeton Review. This sale never took place and the investors returned the company to Schechter's care.

The price of services went from $495 to $595, then to $795, $995, $1095, $1195, $1295, and $1595 over a 20-year period. Additional students in the same family were first $150, then $195, $295, and $495. In 2011 Edifi was faced with a national recession, increased air fares because of oil price increases, inability to raise prices further (price resistance), and the impracticality of automating an online application, as opposed to a paper FAFSA that came out of the computer printer in seconds.  Maura Kastberg wanted to transfer FAFSA application data electronically, even before the FAFSA was put on line, but the Department of Education refused this.

Faced with this situation, the company ceased selling new contracts, terminated most employees, moved back to Schenectady, and limited its activities to servicing contracts which had already been sold. As of 2015 it is out of business, and no longer has a Web site.

References

Student financial aid in the United States
Education finance in the United States
Defunct education companies of the United States
Companies based in Albany County, New York
Education in Albany County, New York
1991 establishments in Massachusetts